Ibrahim Kipkemboi Hussein (born 3 June  1958 in Kapsabet, Rift Valley) is a retired long-distance runner from Kenya, who was a three-time winner of the Boston Marathon in 1988, 1991, and 1992. He was also the first winner from Kenya of the New York City Marathon in 1987, and multiple other marathons in his years. He and his wife Zainab Ibrahim are both alumni at the University of New Mexico in Albuquerque, NM. Ibrahim Hussein is among many athletes on the Hall of Fame in New Mexico. The couple have five children, Hussein Ibrahim, Farida Ibrahim, Hadija Ibrahim, Jamal Ibrahim and Warda Ibrahim.

Ibrahim Hussein was the first Kenyan (and also the first African) to win Boston, setting a world record and having books written on his legacy. Since his 1988 win, the Kenyans have come to dominate Boston, having won the race every year since 1988 with only nine years of exception. The only non-Africans to win Boston since 1988 were South Korean  Lee Bong-Ju, Italian Gelindo Bordin, and Japanese Yuki Kawauchi.

He is now retired and owns Amedo Center, which is an apartment complex that comprises a restaurant, pool place and an electronics shop. in Eldoret, Kenya, as well as many other properties in Kenya. He also runs a training camp for young Kenyan athletes who are given a chance to race alongside elite athletes. He was the chairman of Athletics Kenya North Rift branch. He now holds one of only nine offices in the world at the Regional Development Center in Nairobi, after John Velzian's retirement. He works as a representative of English-speaking countries in Africa, holding one of the important offices associated with International Association of Athletics Federation (IAAF), which is an athletic federation governing the sport of athletics.

His 1988 win in Boston was a photo finish with Juma Ikangaa. Hussein held off Ikangaa by a mere second. This was the closest Boston Marathon finish ever up until that point. There would be a closer finish in 2000 when Elijah Lagat won. Ikangaa would go on to finish second again in the next two Boston Marathons but would never win it.

He is the older brother of Mbarak Hussein, a naturalized U.S. citizen who is an elite Master's marathoner in his own right and who has two top five finishes himself in Boston (fifth in 2001 and fourth in 2002.) 

Hussein is a graduate of St. Patrick's High School (Iten, Kenya) and the University of New Mexico (Albuquerque, New Mexico, USA).

Achievements

See also
 List of winners of the Boston Marathon

References

1958 births
Living people
Kenyan male long-distance runners
Kenyan male marathon runners
Athletes (track and field) at the 1988 Summer Olympics
Athletes (track and field) at the 1992 Summer Olympics
Athletes (track and field) at the 1990 Commonwealth Games
Olympic athletes of Kenya
Commonwealth Games competitors for Kenya
New York City Marathon male winners
Boston Marathon male winners
People from Nandi County
20th-century Kenyan people
21st-century Kenyan people